Eccleshill United Football Club is a football club based in Wrose, Bradford, West Yorkshire, England.

History
The club was established before World War II but was disbanded due to the war. After reforming in 1948, they were members of the Bradford Amateur League in the 1950s. The club won the Bradford Amateur League Cup in 1961–62, and later moved up to the West Riding County Amateur League, reaching the Premier Division in 1972 and winning the league in 1976–77. In 1982 the club applied to join the Northern Counties East League, but were rejected. The 1984–85 season saw the club win the Bradford & District Senior Cup, and at the end of the season the club were accepted into Division Three of the Northern Counties East League after making improvements to their ground. The following season saw the club retain the Bradford & District Senior Cup.

At the end of the 1985–86 season Division Three was abolished and Eccleshill were moved up to Division Two. They finished as runners-up in 1986–87 and were promoted to Division One. Despite only finishing fifth in 1990–91, they were promoted to the Premier Division. The club spent three seasons in the Premier Division before being relegated at the end of the 1993–94 season. After winning Division One in 1996–97, the club were promoted back to the Premier Division. In 2008–09 they finished bottom of the Premier Division and were relegated back to Division One. The club won the West Riding County Challenge Cup in 2013–14. The 2017–18 season saw them finish fourth in Division One, qualifying for the promotion play-offs. After beating Shirebrook Town 4–2 after extra time in the semi-finals, they defeated Grimsby Borough 3–2 in the final, earning promotion to the Premier Division.

Ground
The club initially played at the Recreation Ground, before moving to Acre Fields in the 1950s. In 1963 land was purchased at a former quarry at Plumpton Park, which was developed into two football pitches. A clubhouse was built in 1974 and terracing installed in the early 1980s as the club looked to move up to the Northern Counties East League. The ground currently has a capacity of 2,225, of which 225 is seated and 415 covered.

Honours
Northern Counties East League
Division One champions 1996–97
West Riding County Amateur League
Champions 1976–77
West Riding County Cup
Winners 2013–14
Bradford Amateur League
League Cup winners 1961–62
Bradford & District Senior Cup
Winners 1984–85, 1985–86

Records
Best FA Cup performance: Second qualifying round, 1999–2000, 2001–02, 2002–03
Best FA Vase performance: Fifth round, 1999–2000
Record attendance: 948 vs Bradford City, friendly, 19 July 2017
Biggest win: 10–1
Heaviest defeat: 6–0

See also
Eccleshill United F.C. players
Eccleshill United F.C. managers

References

External links
Official website

 
Football clubs in England
Football clubs in West Yorkshire
Sport in Bradford
Association football clubs established in 1948
1948 establishments in England
West Riding County Amateur Football League
Northern Counties East Football League